Nikita Aleksandrovich Nikitin (born 16 June 1986) is a Russian professional ice hockey defenseman who currently plays for Traktor Chelyabinsk in the Kontinental Hockey League (KHL). He formerly played in the National Hockey League (NHL) with the St. Louis Blues, Columbus Blue Jackets and Edmonton Oilers.

Playing career
Nikitin spent his junior career skating in the Avangard Omsk hockey system. He was a regular on Russia's under-18 and under-20 national squads and spent several seasons skating in the professional Russian Superleague (RSL) with Avangard, establishing himself as a strong Superleague-calibre defense-man.

Nikitin was drafted by the St. Louis Blues with the 136th overall selection in the 2004 NHL Entry Draft.  On 14 June 2010, he was signed by the Blues to an entry-level NHL contract. He scored his first NHL goal on 6 February 2011 against Dan Ellis of the Tampa Bay Lightning. He was traded on 10 November 2011, to the Columbus Blue Jackets for defenceman Kris Russell.

After Columbus agreed to give the Edmonton Oilers permission to negotiate with Nikitin on 20 June 2014, Nikitin and Edmonton agreed to a two-year deal worth an annual average value of $4.5 million, and his rights were traded to Edmonton on 25 June, where he immediately signed the new contract.

Having returned to the KHL with Avangard Omsk for the 2016–17 season, Nikitin continued in Russia, joining his second KHL outfit in Traktor Chelyabinsk on October 3, 2017.

Career statistics

Regular season and playoffs

International

References

External links

RussianProspects.com Nikita Nikitin Player Profile

1986 births
Avangard Omsk players
Bakersfield Condors players
Columbus Blue Jackets players
Edmonton Oilers players
Ice hockey players at the 2014 Winter Olympics
Living people
Olympic ice hockey players of Russia
Peoria Rivermen (AHL) players
Russian ice hockey defencemen
Sportspeople from Omsk
St. Louis Blues draft picks
St. Louis Blues players
Traktor Chelyabinsk players